Barry Armstrong (born 22 September 1950) is a former Australian rules footballer who played with Carlton in the VFL during the 1970s.

Armstrong was a versatile player, used most often as a centreman and ruck rover. Twice a premiership player with Carlton, he is a member of the Carlton Hall of Fame.

External links

1950 births
Living people
Australian rules footballers from Victoria (Australia)
Carlton Football Club players
Carlton Football Club Premiership players
Two-time VFL/AFL Premiership players